Vugar Beybalayev (born on 5 August 1993) is an Azerbaijani professional footballer who plays as a midfielder for FC Telavi in the Erovnuli Liga.

Club career
On 13 February 2013, Beybalayev made his debut in the Azerbaijan Premier League for Turan-Tovuz match against Baku.

References

External links
 

1993 births
Living people
Association football midfielders
Azerbaijani footballers
Azerbaijan Premier League players
FC Baku players
Turan-Tovuz IK players
Ravan Baku FC players
Khazar Lankaran FK players
Kapaz PFK players
Sumgayit FK players
Sabail FK players
FC Telavi players
Erovnuli Liga players
People from Sumgait
Expatriate footballers in Georgia (country)
Azerbaijani expatriate footballers
Azerbaijani expatriate sportspeople in Georgia (country)